The 2019 Team Long Track World Championship was the 13th annual FIM Team Long Track World Championship. The final took place on 7 September 2019 in Vechta, Germany.

Results
  Vechta
 7 September 2019

See also
 2019 Individual Long Track World Championship
 2019 Speedway of Nations

References

Team Long Track World Championship